German submarine U-2516 was a Type XXI U-boat (Elektroboot) of Nazi Germany's Kriegsmarine during the Second World War. She spent the war as a trials vessel and was damaged beyond repair by a British air raid while docked and scrapped in Kiel, Germany.

Construction 
The U-2516 was laid down on 3 August 1944 at the Blohm & Voss shipyard in Hamburg, Germany. She was launched on 27 September 1944 and commissioned on 24 October 1944 under the command of Oberleutnant zur See der Reserve Fritz Kallipke with her U-boat emblem being a red deer.

She was assessed at  submerged and  when at the surface.

The submarine was fitted with six  torpedo tubes (All fitted at the bow) and 23 torpedoes or 17 torpedoes and 12 mines. The boat was also equipped with four  C/30 anti-aircraft guns. The submarine had a complement of five officers and 52 men.

Service History
U-2516 did not undertake any combat patrols and was instead assigned as a trials boat to the 31st U-boat Flotilla from 24 October 1944 onward always serving under the same commander until her career's end.

The U-2516 was docked at drydock number 1 in Kiel, Germany, on 9 April 1945 when the docks were attacked at 22:30 by British RAF bombers from Bomber Command's 1st, 3rd and 8th Groups. There were three men aboard U-2516 at the time of the attack working in the engine room. Two of them were killed when several bombs hit U-2516, which had also damaged her beyond repair ending her war career. The wreck of U-2516 lay where she was sunk until she was scrapped after the war's end.

References

Bibliography

Type XXI submarines
U-boats commissioned in 1944
U-boats sunk in 1945
World War II submarines of Germany
1944 ships
Ships built in Hamburg
Maritime incidents in April 1945
U-boats sunk by British aircraft